William Anthony Munro (born 29 September 1992) is an Australian rugby player who has represented NSW in the Australian National Rugby Championship. He played for the NSW Country Eagles squad in 2014 and Greater Sydney Rams in 2015 while studying at the University of Sydney.

Munro began his first-grade rugby career debut in 2013 playing for the Randwick DRUFC where he won best and fairest award. From January 2017, Munro has played matches for the Australian Barbarians, the Hong Kong Football Club, the Classic Wallabies and French Fédérale 1 league team AS.Mâcon. In January 2019, Munro was signed onto the Glendale Raptors to play in the 2019 season.

See also 

 Australian Barbarians

References 

1992 births
Living people
Rugby union players from Sydney
Barbarian F.C. players